Julia Rachel Cumming (born January 16, 1996) is an American singer-songwriter who is the frontwoman and bass player of the Brooklyn-based band Sunflower Bean. Cumming models occasionally, and has modeled for several well known designers and has appeared in global campaigns for H&M and Diesel. Cumming is also a political activist and is active in the Model Alliance. She has produced and directed a video featuring her fellow models, encouraging young people to become politically active.

Early life 
Cumming was born in Manhattan to Alec Cumming and Cynthia Harden, who (at the time) were a creative partnership as well as a marital one - writing, performing, and releasing songs in the alternative pop band Bite The Wax Godhead (1990-1998). Julia grew up in the East Village, Manhattan, attended New York City public schools, and started a band - Supercute! - along with neighborhood friends June Lei and Rachel Trachtenburg (of the Trachtenburg Family Slideshow Players) in 2009. Supercute!, a bubblegum-girl-group-psychedelic-pop amalgam, created (in Cumming's words) "ukulele rock operas"; the band lasted through 2013 with Cumming and Trachtenburg serving as their creative core. "It was almost an art project about not letting your age or being a girl stop you from trying anything," Julia told the New Musical Express in 2016. Cumming and Trachtenburg also co-hosted a talk show (Pure Imagination, 2011-2013), on the Progressive Radio Network, aimed at encouraging fellow teens to become involved in art and political action.

In 2014, Cumming graduated as a vocal music student at Professional Performing Arts School, made her acting debut in the movie short People Who Don't Know Me, and performed solo gigs with original musical material at local clubs. She also interned at the Museum of Modern Art, where she curated an off-site show about instagram art. There she met choreographer Dean Moss, who cast her for a leading role in his dance piece johnbrown, which debuted at The Kitchen on October 16, 2014.

Musical influences
"When I was a really little kid," Cumming told the New York Times, "my parents had a VHS tape called 'Glam Rock.' It was about 15 songs of Gary Glitter, T. Rex and Alice Cooper, and I watched it every day until it broke." She has said that other influences include The Beach Boys and Brian Wilson, The Beatles, Devo, Fat White Family, Carole King, The Kinks, Cate Le Bon, Mr Little Jeans, Joni Mitchell, Kate Nash, New York Dolls, Plastic Ono Band, Iggy Pop, The Sex Pistols,  Tina Weymouth and Talking Heads, The Velvet Underground, The Waitresses and The Who.

Sunflower Bean 

In August 2013, Cumming joined guitarist Nick Kivlen and drummer Olive Faber in Sunflower Bean, a power trio initially based in Glen Head, New York that had started off a spin-off of the band Turnip King. In the following year, the band moved to Bushwick, Brooklyn and became a part of the borough's thriving "DIY" scene, playing over eighty shows that year and earning themselves title of New York City's "hardest-working band of 2014". The band's appearance at the 2014 CMJ Music Marathon received good notices from All Songs Considered's Bob Boilen and from The New York Times's Jon Pareles, who wrote "New York is still home to bands as varied as Sunflower Bean, whose music suggests what might have happened if psychedelia had emerged after punk and the Police rather than before."

The band recorded their debut EP Show Me Your Seven Secrets (initially self-released on January 27, 2015) and was signed to Fat Possum Records later that year. The album Human Ceremony was released on February 5, 2016, garnering largely positive reviews;

"I Was a Fool", the first single released from Sunflower Bean's second album Twentytwo In Blue, debuted on NPR's "Songs We Love" series on November 3, 2017. Twentytwo In Blue was released on March 23, 2018 by Mom + Pop Music in the U.S. and Lucky Number Music worldwide.

She has collaborated with other artists and appeared on the Manic Street Preachers album The Ultra Vivid Lament in 2021.

Modeling career

Although Cumming had done occasional modeling jobs in the Supercute! era, her fashion career was bolstered in February 2014, when she was asked to walk in Yves Saint Laurent's Ready To Wear Fall Winter 2014 show in Paris. Saint Laurent's creative director Hedi Slimane signed the musician to an exclusive modeling contract, using her in three campaigns and in six shows for Saint Laurent; Cumming was frequently referred to as "Hedi Slimane's muse" in the press at the time.

Since then, she has modeled for Anna Sui, Elsa Schiaparelli, Max Mara, Rochas and Fausto Puglisi, appeared in global campaigns for H&M and Diesel, and was seen on the cover of Harper's Bazaar Kazakhstan and in many fashion editorials, most notably in many of Vogue's international editions (US, UK, France, Italy, Spain, Brazil, Mexico, Australia, Japan). In March 2017, Cumming appeared with Madonna for Vogue Germany in the news-making film and photo spread "Her Story", released on International Women's Day 2017.

Political activism 

In 2017, Cumming founded Anger Can Be Power, a project that "endeavors to invoke the DIY spirit to inspire people to integrate political involvement in their lives"; she has hosted several public events dedicated to the topic of young people, particularly women, moving into concrete political action. Cumming is also active in the Model Alliance, and directed and produced a video featuring fellow models that encourages young people to directly call their political representatives. She interviewed Iranian-American singer Rahill Jamalifard (from Habibi) about her experiences as a volunteer Persian translator during the protests against Donald Trump's travel ban at John F. Kennedy International Airport.

References

External links
 Julia Cumming @ models.com
 Julia Cumming is Supercute!
 Julia Cumming is Rock & Roll
 Julia Cumming's Instagram
 Sunflower Bean's Bandcamp page

1996 births
21st-century American women singers
21st-century American singers
21st-century American musicians
Activists from New York City
American activists
American rock bass guitarists
Child indie musicians
Women bass guitarists
Female models from New York (state)
American women rock singers
People from the East Village, Manhattan
Singers from New York City
Living people
21st-century American bass guitarists